Edmund John Holden Eckersley, (born 9 August 1989) is an English cricketer. He is a right-handed batsman and wicket-keeper. He was a core player of Leicestershire from 2011 to 2018. After his release from Leicestershire he signed for Durham

Career

Eckersley made his List A debut playing for the Marylebone Cricket Club (MCC) in 2008, having previously played for Middlesex Second XI and the MCC Young Cricketers. His debut, against Bangladesh A, saw him make three catches as wicketkeeper, but he only scored one run. As a member of the MCC Young Cricketers squad, he was chosen to perform 12th man duties in the 2009 Ashes Lord's Test and got the opportunity to field on the fourth day.

In 2010, Eckersley was selected as one of 21 players to form the first Unicorns squad to take part in the Clydesdale Bank 40 domestic one day competition against the regular first-class counties. The Unicorns were made up of 15 former county cricket professionals and 6 young cricketers looking to make it in the professional game. In 2011, Eckersley was offered a trial at Leicestershire after some impressive performances in 2010 for the MCC Young Cricketers. He spent most of the season with the Second XI, becoming the team's highest scorer, and was rewarded for this late  in the 2011 season with a debut for the Leicestershire First XI, against Surrey at Grace Road. He then followed that up with some solid batting displays against Gloucestershire in particular, making his maiden first-class fifty, and taking four catches as wicketkeeper. He then spent the close season playing for Mountaineers in Zimbabwe.

In the 2012 season he made excellent progress with Leicestershire including a six and a half-hour innings against Glamorgan. His score of 137 not out was part of a second wicket stand of 245 with Michael Thornely, and was a career best for him at the time. He followed this with an extremely successful 2013 season, for which 
he was named CricInfo's breakthrough player of the season. He topped Leicestershire's first-class batting averages, with 1302 runs at 50.07, nearly twice as many runs as any other Leicestershire player. He made four first-class centuries, plus one score of 108 in a 40-over game, and was rewarded with his county cap in September. His season was mired somewhat, however, on 1 September when both he and Josh Cobb were arrested by police for being drunk and disorderly in Leicester city centre. Both received fines.

References

External links

1989 births
Living people
People educated at St Benedict's School, Ealing
English cricketers
Marylebone Cricket Club cricketers
Leicestershire cricketers
Durham cricketers
Cricketers from Oxford
English cricketers of the 21st century
Wicket-keepers